Terence Michael Green (born 2 February 1947) is a Canadian science-fiction and fantasy writer. He has published short stories and novels, among the best received of which is Children of the Rainbow (1992). His works focus on characterization and explore the complexity of social relationships.

Early life and education
Green was born in Toronto, Ontario to Thomas and Margaret. He received a BA in English in 1967 from the University of Toronto, an MA from University College, Dublin, and a BEd in 1973 from the University of Toronto.

Career
Green has published both short stories and novels. His first Canadian publication was "Of children in the foliage", which was included in Aurora: New Canadian Writing 1979, and his first US publication was "Till death do us part", included in the December 1981 issue of The Magazine of Fantasy & Science Fiction.

Green's first novel was Barking Dogs (1988), an expanded version of a 1984 short story of the same title following a Toronto policeman in a crime-ridden near future. In this world it is possible to buy portable lie detectors ("barking dogs"), which affect how justice and social relationships change as a result of being able to discern when someone is not telling the truth.

Four years later, Green published the more highly acclaimed Children of the Rainbow (1992). It is a time travel novel, which combines elements of Mutiny on the Bounty, anti-nuclear protests, and Inca religion. Douglas Barbour of Canadian Forum wrote that Green was "very good at showing the psychological disruption the time shifts create in his two central characters".

In Shadow of Ashland (1996), an expanded short story, Green drew on his own life and that of his family to write about a son's search for his dying mother's brother. Malachy Duffy of The New York Times Book Review praised the novel's "dedication to exploring its underlying themes of redemption, resolution and homecoming". This novel has been described as "closer to 'magic realism' than to traditional science fiction". Green wrote two sequels to Shadow of Ashland that continued to explore these familiar themes: A Witness to Life (1999) and St. Patrick's Bed (2001).

The year after Shadow of Ashland, Green published Blue Limbo (1997), a futuristic thriller that follows the same policeman in Barking Dogs. At the center of the novel is the "Blue Limbo" technique, which allows the dead to be brought back to consciousness, and a rogue cop's desire to avenge the murder of his partner.

Green's style has been described as "quiet" and "restrained". The St. James Guide to Science Fiction Writers contends that his "science fiction is quintessentially Canadian, with its graceful focus on characterization, its rhetorical understatement, its placing of characters in a complex social environment, as well as its refusal to explore technology for itself alone."

Personal life and current
In 1968, Green married Penny Dakin, whom he divorced in 1990; they have two sons, Conor and Owen. He married Merle Casci in 1994, with whom he has one son, Daniel. Green has retired from teaching English at East York Collegiate Institute, where he worked since 1968, and now teaches creative-writing part-time at Western University (London, Ontario, Canada).

Awards
3 Canada Council for the Arts Grants in 1992 (2), and 2003
4 Ontario Arts Council Grants in 1991 through 1993
2 Toronto Arts Council Grants in 2000, 2002

2-time World Fantasy Award nominee (1997, 2000);
5-time Prix Aurora Award nominee (1990 through 1998)

This selected list of works is taken from Contemporary Authors Online:

The Woman Who Is the Midnight Wind (1987)
Barking Dogs (1988)
Children of the Rainbow (1992)
Shadow of Ashland (1996)
Blue Limbo (1997)
A Witness to Life (1999)
St. Patrick's Bed (2001)
Sailing Time's Ocean (2006)

References

External links
Official website

Canadian science fiction writers
Living people
1947 births